Jean Simon Pictet (2 September 1914, Geneva – 30 March 2002, Meyrin) was a Swiss citizen, jurist, legal practitioner working in international humanitarian law.  First as a secretary-jurist, and then as a senior executive and Vice-President of the International Committee of the Red Cross (ICRC), Pictet was instrumental in drafting the 1949 Geneva Conventions for the protection of victims of war, their Commentaries, and negotiating the 1977 Additional Protocols (Protocol I and Protocol II).  He also proposed the Red Cross Movement’s seven Fundamental Principles, which were adopted at Vienna in 1965: Humanity, Impartiality, Neutrality, Independence, Voluntary Service, Unity and Universality.  In 1989, an international humanitarian law competition for students was founded and named after him.

Life
After secondary education in Paris, Pictet completed his study of law at the University of Geneva, earning a doctorate in 1935 and then practiced law in Vienna and Geneva. In 1937, he began working as a legal assistant at the International Committee of the Red Cross. During the Second World War he wrote most of the ICRC's appeals on behalf of prisoners of wars and civilian victims of the war. and was one of the key staff of the Committee and worked directly with ICRC President Max Huber.  Even before the war ended, he embarked on a project for a complete overhaul of the Geneva Conventions, in particular including the protection of civilians, despite Huber's pessimism about its prospects. 1946 he became Director in the Directorate and the ICRC. In 1966 he became Director General of the ICRC Directorate and thus held the highest office in the administration of the committee. From 1967 to 1979 he was a member of the ICRC (restricted to 25 Swiss citizens) and from 1971 to 1979 was the Vice President.

Pictet was responsible for directing the establishment of the general report on the work of the ICRC during the global conflict. He ran for the ICRC, the work and negotiations that led to the revision of the Regulations of the Red Cross International in 1952, and agreements with the League of Red Cross. He also chaired the conference of experts to prepare for the negotiation of the two Protocols Additional to the Geneva Conventions of 1977. He was the general editor of the four volume commentary on the Conventions. His short 1955 volume Les Principes de la Croix-Rouge (Red Cross Principles) was a decisive step in formulating common principles of the different organizations of the Red Cross Movement, and led to the unanimous adoption by the 1965 XXth International Conference of the Red Cross in Vienna, of the seven Fundamental Principles of the Red Cross. He was also involved in drafting the statutes of the Movement.

Pictet was appointed lecturer at the University of Geneva and Professor of International Humanitarian Law at the Faculty of Law and Associate Professor 1974 to 1979. He also lectured at the Academy of International Law (1950) and the International Institute of Human Rights (1971, 1972, 1982). From 1975 to 1981 he was director and president of the Henry Dunant Institute, research center, training and teaching of the International Red Cross.

Pictet was the main author of the commentary on the four Geneva Conventions of 1949 and in 1977 completed two additional protocols. He also published the 1948 "Report of the International Committee of the Red Cross on its activities during the Second World War (1 September 1939-30 June 1947)" and later presented with the basis for publications in 1965 adopted seven principles of the International Red Cross and Red Crescent movement. Among his other works include several works on international humanitarian law and about the Native Americans.

Honours

Pictet received honorary doctorates from the Universities of Leiden, Zurich, and Leuven, as well as several awards from the International Red Cross and Red Crescent Movement, including posthumously in 2005 the Henry Dunant Medal, the highest award of the movement. The bilingual, international Jean-Pictet Competition, which focuses on international humanitarian law, was named after him.

Works

 (Translation of Le droit humanitaire et la protection des victimes de la guerre.)

References

External links
Jean Pictet Competition
Hommage à Jean Pictet
The Man Who Wrote the Rules of War, 12 August 1999, The Guardian

Red Cross personnel
1914 births
2002 deaths
Lawyers from Geneva
International law scholars
Geneva Conventions
Moot court competitions
Law of war
20th-century Swiss lawyers